The Grapes of Wrath is a 1940 American drama film directed by John Ford. It was based on John Steinbeck's 1939 Pulitzer Prize-winning novel of the same name. The screenplay was written by Nunnally Johnson and the executive producer was Darryl F. Zanuck.

The film tells the story of the Joads, an Oklahoma family of sharecroppers, who, after losing their farm to increased mechanization during the Great Depression in the 1930s, become migrant workers, and end up in California. The motion picture details their arduous journey across the United States as they travel to California in search of work and opportunities for the family members, and features cinematography by Gregg Toland.

The film is widely considered to be one of the greatest films of all time. In 1989, it was one of the first 25 films selected by the Library of Congress for preservation in the United States National Film Registry for being "culturally, historically, or aesthetically significant".

Plot
After being released from prison, Tom Joad hitchhikes his way to his share-cropper parents' farm in Oklahoma. He comes upon Jim Casy, an itinerant man sitting under a tree by the roadside. Tom remembers Casy as the preacher who baptized him, but Casy has "lost the spirit" and his faith. Casy goes with Tom to the Joad property. It is deserted but they find neighbor Muley Graves, who is hiding out there. In a flashback, he describes how the local farmers were forced from their farms by the land deedholders, who knocked down their houses with tractors. Tom soon reunites with the family at his uncle's house. The Joads are migrating with other evicted families to the promised land of California. They pack everything into a dilapidated car adapted to serve as a truck to make the long journey. Casy decides to accompany them.

The trip along Highway 66 is arduous, and it soon takes a toll on the Joad family. The elderly Grandpa dies along the way. Tom writes the circumstances surrounding the death on a page from the family Bible and places it on the body before they bury it, so his death will not be mistaken as a homicide if discovered. They park in a camp and meet a migrant man returning from California. He scoffs at Pa's optimism about opportunities in California and speaks bitterly about his experiences in the West. Grandma dies when they reach California. Eldest son, Noah, leaves the family, while son-in-law, Connie, deserts his pregnant wife, Rose-of-Sharon.

The family arrives at the first transient migrant campground for workers. The camp is crowded with other starving, jobless, and desperate travelers. As their truck slowly makes its way through a row of shanty houses and around the camp's hungry-faced inhabitants, Tom notes it, "Sure don't look none too prosperous."

After seeing trouble between the sheriff and an agitator, the Joads hurriedly leave the camp. The family goes to another migrant camp, the Keene Ranch. After working in the fields, they discover the high food prices in the company store, the only one in the area. When a group of migrant workers is striking, Tom wants to learn more about it. He attends a secret meeting in the dark woods. When the gathering is discovered, Casy is killed by a camp guard. Tom inadvertently kills the guard while defending himself.

Tom suffers a serious cheek wound, making him easily recognizable. That evening, the family hides Tom when guards arrive searching for who killed the guard. Tom avoids being spotted, and the family leaves the Keene Ranch without further incident. After driving awhile, the truck breaks down at the crest of a hill. They have little gas and decide to coast down the hill to where there are some lights. They arrive at the Farmworkers' Weedpatch Camp ("Wheat Patch"), a clean facility run by the Department of Agriculture, complete with indoor toilets and showers, which the Joad children have never seen before.

Tom is moved to work for change by what he has witnessed in the various camps. He tells his family that he plans to carry on Casy's mission by fighting for workers rights.

Cast

 Henry Fonda as Tom Joad
 Jane Darwell as "Ma" Joad
 John Carradine as Jim Casy
 Charley Grapewin as William James "Grandpa" Joad
 Dorris Bowdon as Rose of Sharon "Rosasharn" Joad
 Russell Simpson as "Pa" Joad
 O. Z. Whitehead as Al Joad
 John Qualen as Muley Graves
 Eddie Quillan as Connie Rivers
 Zeffie Tilbury as Grandma Joad
 Frank Sully as Noah Joad
 Frank Darien as Uncle John
 Darryl Hickman as Winfield Joad
 Shirley Mills as Ruth "Ruthie" Joad
 Roger Imhof as Mr. Thomas
 Grant Mitchell as Caretaker
 Charles D. Brown as Wilkie
 John Arledge as Davis
 Ward Bond as Policeman
 Harry Tyler as Bert
 William Pawley as Bill
 Charles Tannen as Joe
 Selmer Jackson as Inspection Officer
 Charles Middleton as Leader
 Eddie Waller as Proprietor
 Paul Guilfoyle as Floyd
 David Hughes as Frank
 Cliff Clark as City Man
 Joseph Sawyer as Keene Ranch Foreman
 Frank Faylen as Tim
 Adrian Morris as Agent
 Hollis Jewell as Muley's Son
 Robert Homans as Spencer
 Irving Bacon as Driver
 Kitty McHugh as Mae
 Tom Tyler as Deputy (uncredited)
 Joe Bordeaux as Migrant (uncredited)
 Jack Perrin as Migrant (uncredited)
 Frank O'Connor	as Deputy #1 (uncredited)
 George O'Hara as Clerk (uncredited)
  Francis Ford as Migrant (uncredited)

Novel
According to The New York Times, The Grapes of Wrath was America's best-selling book of 1939 and 430,000 copies had been printed by February 1940.
In that month, it won the National Book Award, favorite fiction book of 1939, voted by members of the American Booksellers Association. Soon, it won the Pulitzer Prize for Fiction.

In 1962, the Nobel Prize committee said The Grapes of Wrath was "great work" and one of the committee's main reasons for granting Steinbeck the Nobel Prize for Literature. Time magazine included the novel in its "100 Best English-language Novels from 1923 to 2005" list. In 2009, The Daily Telegraph also included the novel in its list of "100 novels everyone should read". In 1998, the Modern Library ranked The Grapes of Wrath tenth on its list of the 100 best English-language novels of the 20th century.

Differences from the novel
The first part of the film follows the book fairly closely. However, the second half and the ending in particular are significantly different from the book. While the book ends with the downfall and break-up of the Joad family, the film switches the order of sequences so that the family ends up in a "good" camp provided by the government, and things turn out relatively well for them.

In the novel, Rose-of-Sharon ("Rosasharn") Rivers (played in the film by Dorris Bowdon) gives birth to a stillborn baby. Later, she offers her milk-filled breasts to a starving man, dying in a barn. These scenes were not included in the film.

While the film is somewhat stark, it has a more optimistic and hopeful view than the novel, especially when the Joads land at the Department of Agriculture camp – the clean camp. Also, the producers decided to tone down Steinbeck's political references, such as eliminating a monologue using a land owner's description of "reds" as anybody "that wants thirty cents an hour when we're payin' twenty-five," to show that under the prevalent conditions that definition applies to every migrant worker looking for better wages.

The film emphasizes Ma Joad's pragmatic, forward-looking way of dealing with their situation despite Tom's departure, as it concludes with her spiritual "We're the people" speech.

Ivy and Sairy Wilson, who attend to Grandpa's death and travel with the Joads until they reach California, are left out of the movie entirely. Noah's departure from the family is passed over in the movie. Instead, he simply disappears without explanation. In the book, Floyd tells Tom about how the workers were being exploited, but in the movie he does not appear until after the deputy arrives in Hooverville. Sandry, the religious fanatic who scares Rose-of-Sharon, is left out of the movie.

Vivian Sobchack argued that the film uses visual imagery to focus on the Joads as a family unit, whereas the novel focuses on their journey as a part of the "family of man". She points out that their farm is never shown in detail, and that the family members are never shown working in agriculture; not a single peach is shown in the entire film. This subtly serves to focus the film on the specific family, as opposed to the novel's focus on man and land together.

In the film, most of the Joad family members are either reduced to background characters – in the case of Al, Noah, and Uncle John – or to being the focus of only one or two relatively minor scenes – like Rose-of-Sharon and Connie. Instead, the film is largely concerned with Tom, Ma, and (to a lesser extent) Jim Casy. Thus, despite the film's focus on the Joads as a specific family rather than a part of the "family of man", the movie explores very little of the members of the family itself.

Soundtrack
 Henry Fonda – "Red River Valley" (Traditional)
 Eddie Quillan – "Going Down the Road Feeling Bad" (Traditional)
 "A-Tisket, A-Tasket" (Words and music by Ella Fitzgerald and Van Alexander)

Production
Executive producer Darryl F. Zanuck was nervous about the left-wing political views of the novel, especially the ending. Due to the red-baiting common to the era, Darryl Zanuck sent private investigators to Oklahoma to help him legitimize the film.

When Zanuck's investigators found that the "Okies'" predicament was indeed terrible, Zanuck was confident he could defend political attacks that the film was somehow pro-Communist. Critic Roger Ebert believes that World War II also helped sell the film's message, as Communism received a brief respite from American demonizing during that period.

Production on the film began on October 4, 1939, and was completed on November 16, 1939. Some of the filming locations include: McAlester and Sayre, both in Oklahoma; Gallup, Laguna Pueblo, and Santa Rosa, all in New Mexico; Thousand Oaks, Lamont, Needles, and the San Fernando Valley, all in California; Topock and the Petrified Forest National Park, both in Arizona.

The film score by Alfred Newman is based on the song "Red River Valley". Additionally, the song "Goin' Down the Road Feelin' Bad" is sung in a nighttime scene at a roadside New Mexico camp.

The film premiered in New York City on January 24, 1940, and Los Angeles on January 27, 1940. The wide release date in the United States was March 15, 1940.

Reception

Critical response
Frank Nugent of The New York Times wrote:

In the vast library where the celluloid literature of the screen is stored there is one small, uncrowded shelf devoted to the cinema's masterworks, to those films which by dignity of theme and excellence of treatment seem to be of enduring artistry, seem destined to be recalled not merely at the end of their particular year but whenever great motion pictures are mentioned. To that shelf of screen classics Twentieth Century-Fox yesterday added its version of John Steinbeck's The Grapes of Wrath, adapted by Nunnally Johnson, directed by John Ford and performed at the Rivoli by a cast of such uniform excellence and suitability that we should be doing its other members an injustice by saying it was "headed" by Henry Fonda, Jane Darwell, John Carradine and Russell Simpson.

When critic Bosley Crowther retired in 1967, he named The Grapes of Wrath one of the best fifty films ever made.

In a film review written for Time magazine by its editor Whittaker Chambers, he separated his views of Steinbeck's novel from Ford's film, which he liked.

Chambers wrote:

But people who go to pictures for the sake of seeing pictures will see a great one. For The Grapes of Wrath is possibly the best picture ever made from a so-so book...Camera craft purged the picture of the editorial rash that blotched the Steinbeck book. Cleared of excrescences, the residue is a great human story which made thousands of people, who damned the novel's phony conclusions, read it. It is the saga of an authentic U.S. farming family who lose their land. They wander, they suffer, but they endure. They are never quite defeated, and their survival is itself a triumph.

A review in Variety reported, "Here is outstanding entertainment, projected against a heart-rending sector of the American scene," concluding, "It possesses an adult viewpoint and its success may lead other producers to explore the rich field of contemporary life which films long have neglected and ignored." John Mosher wrote in The New Yorker, "With a majesty never before so constantly sustained on any screen, the film never for an instant falters. Its beauty is of the sort found in the art of Burchfield, Benton and Curry, as the landscape and people involved belong to the world of these painters."

The Film Daily year-end poll of 546 critics nationwide ranked The Grapes of Wrath as the second-best film of 1940, behind only Rebecca.

Awards and nominations

American Film Institute recognition
 AFI's 100 Years... 100 Movies – #21
 AFI's 100 Years... 100 Heroes and Villains:
 Tom Joad – #12 Hero
 AFI's 100 Years... 100 Movie Quotes:
 "Wherever there's a fight so hungry people can eat, I'll be there." – Nominated
 100 Years...100 Cheers – #7
 100 Years...100 Movies (10th Anniversary) – #23

Home media

The film was released on VHS in 1988 by Key Video. It was later released in video format on March 3, 1998, by 20th Century Fox on its Studio Classic series.

A DVD was released on April 6, 2004, by 20th Century Fox Entertainment. The DVD contains a special commentary track by scholars Joseph McBride and Susan Shillinglaw. It also includes various supplements: an A&E Network biography of Daryl F. Zanuck, outtakes, a gallery, Franklin D. Roosevelt lauds motion pictures at Academy featurette, Movietone news: three drought reports from 1934, etc.

The film was released on Blu-ray on April 3, 2012, and features all supplemental material from the DVD release.

See also
 List of films with a 100% rating on Rotten Tomatoes, a film review aggregator website

References

External links

 
 
 
 
 
 
 The Grapes of Wrath at Film Site by Tim Dirks
  by A. O. Scott (The New York Times)
 The Grapes of Wrath essay by Daniel Eagan in America's Film Legacy: The Authoritative Guide to the Landmark Movies in the National Film Registry, A&C Black, 2010 , pages 309-310 

1940 films
1940 drama films
American black-and-white films
American political drama films
Films about agriculture
Films about farmers
Films about families
Films about the labor movement
Films based on works by John Steinbeck
Films based on American novels
Films set on farms
Films shot in New Mexico
Films shot in Arizona
Films shot in California
Films shot in Oklahoma
Films set in Oklahoma
Films set in Texas
Films set in New Mexico
Films set in Arizona
Films set in California
Great Depression films
American drama road movies
Social realism in film
U.S. Route 66
Articles containing video clips
Film
20th Century Fox films
Films featuring a Best Supporting Actress Academy Award-winning performance
Films whose director won the Best Directing Academy Award
United States National Film Registry films
Films scored by Alfred Newman
Films directed by John Ford
Films produced by Darryl F. Zanuck
Films with screenplays by Nunnally Johnson
Films about internal migration
1940s English-language films
1940s American films